Gal Yekutiel (born November 4, 1981 in Jerusalem, Israel) is an Israeli judoka. He competes in the extra lightweight (under 60 kg) weight category.

Biography
He has represented Israel in the Olympic Games of 2004 and 2008. In the latter, he ranked 5th after losing the bout for the bronze medal. His other major achievement was a bronze medal at the 2007 European Championships.

Achievements

References

External links
 
 
 

1981 births
Living people
Israeli male judoka
Olympic judoka of Israel
Judoka at the 2004 Summer Olympics
Maccabiah Games competitors for Israel
Maccabiah Games judoka
Judoka at the 2008 Summer Olympics
Israeli Jews
Jewish martial artists
21st-century Israeli people